Sports Complex station is a station on Seoul Subway Line 2 and Seoul Subway Line 9. As its name indicates, it serves the nearby Seoul Sports Complex including Seoul Olympic Stadium. Asia Park is also accessible by foot from the station. In early 2015 this station become a transfer station between Line 2 and Line 9 of the Seoul Subway.

Station layout

Line 2

Line 9

Gallery

References

Seoul Metropolitan Subway stations
Metro stations in Songpa District
Railway stations opened in 1980
1980 establishments in South Korea
20th-century architecture in South Korea